Like a Cat is the second extended play by South Korean girl group AOA. It was released on November 11, 2014, by FNC Entertainment. "Like a Cat" was released as the lead single.

Singles
The second track on the EP, "Like a Cat" was written and produced by Brave Brothers and is AOA's third collaboration with him. It is an upbeat track with elements of rock. The music video for "Like a Cat" was released on November 10, 2014. The male actors featured in the music video are Daniel Snoeks (as the banker) and Jake Pains (as one of the bodyguards).

Promotion
The promotion for "Like a Cat" began on November 13, 2014, on M Countdown. On November 19, AOA took first place on MBC Music's Show Champion.

Reception

Critical
"Like a Cat" was selected by Fuse as one of "November's Top 10 Best Pop Songs We Heard", calling the song "an addictive, sultry track that’s one of the boldest pop songs to come out of Korea."

Commercial
"Like a Cat" charted at number 3 on the Gaon Album Chart, while the single peaked at number 5 on Gaon Digital Chart on November 15, 2014, and ranked number 1 on Gaon Social Chart for six consecutive weeks. The song also debuted at number 1 on Philippines' Music One Chart and China's KUWO Chart. It also charted at number 7 on Billboard's World Digital Song Sales chart, marking the group's first appearance on the US charts. As of 2016, the EP has sold 29,588 copies in South Korea.

Japanese version
A Japanese version of the song was released on February 25, 2015, as the group's second Japanese single. It was released in nine different versions: a limited CD+DVD edition (type A), a limited CD+Photobook edition (type B), and seven limited CD only editions, one edition per member. The limited editions types A and B include one random photocard from a set of 22. The single also included Japanese versions of "Elvis" and "Just the Two of Us", and Karaoke versions of all three songs.

The single peaked at number 4 on Oricon's weekly singles chart and number 19 on the monthly chart. It also charted at number 10 on the Japan Hot 100.

Track listing

Charts

Sales and certifications

References

2014 EPs
AOA (group) EPs
Korean-language EPs
FNC Entertainment EPs